State Street Historic District may refer to the following districts on the National Register of Historic Places:
 Dennis-State Streets Historic District, listed on the NRHP in Adrian, Michigan
 State Street Historic District (Boise, Idaho), listed on the National Register of Historic Places (NRHP) in Idaho
 State Street Historic District (North Vernon, Indiana), listed on the NRHP in Indiana
 State Street Historic District (Carthage, New York), listed on the NRHP in Jefferson County, New York
 State Street Historic District (Rochester, New York), listed on the NRHP in New York